Gokulan is an Indian actor who appears in Malayalam films. He made his acting debut through the 2013 Malayalam movie Punyalan Agarbattis by doing the character of Jimbroottan, which became popular. As of 2021, he has so far acted in more than 30 Malayalam movies.

Career
Gokulan made his acting debut in 2013 with the film Punyalan Agarbattis. Even though he did a  minor comedy role called Jimbrootan in the movie, which also had a less screen time, the character became very popular. Gokulan later did different minor roles in some movies. He also appeared in few character roles during this time. He went on to act in the films like Thoppil Joppan, Vaarikkuzhiyile Kolapathakam,  Ente Ummante Peru, Punyalan Private Limited, Sapthamashree Thaskaraha, Pathemari, Ramante Edantottam and several others. But, it was the 2019 movie Unda (film) that gave him a new turn on his film career. Gokulan had a major character role in this movie. His performance in the 2020 movie Love was critically acclaimed. Gokulan then did the notable roles in the movies Innu Mudhal and Randu which was released in March and April 2021 respectively.

Personal life
He married his long time girlfriend Dhanya in May 2020.

Filmography

References

Indian male film actors
Living people
Male actors in Malayalam cinema
20th-century Indian male actors
Film people from Kerala
Year of birth missing (living people)